James Gerald Hirsch (October 31, 1922 – May 25, 1987) was an American physician and biomedical researcher who specialized in immunology. Hirsch was also notable for his studies of phagocyte.

Biography 
Hirsh was born in St. Louis, Missouri on October 31, 1922.

He received his undergraduate degree from Yale University in 1942. Hirsh graduated from Columbia University's College of Physicians and Surgeons in 1946 with an M.D. degree. He became a member of the Rockefeller Institute's faculty in 1950, becoming a full professor in 1960.

In 1957 his research showed that a prolonged rest is not needed for treatment of the tuberculosis, and resulted in international changes to how tuberculosis patients are treated by allowing local hospitals rather than sanatoriums to take care of the sick.

Hirsch died of cancer at the Memorial Sloan-Kettering Cancer Center on May 25, 1987.

Titles
Hirsch was a member of the National Academy of Sciences, president of the Josiah Macy Jr. Foundation, dean of graduate studies at the Rockefeller University, chairman of the Medical Sciences section of the National Academy of Sciences and chairman of the Assembly of Life Sciences of the National Research Council. He was also an editor of the Journal of Experimental Medicine.

Legacy
The New York Times called Hirsch "a leader in blood research". The National Academies Press called him "a pivotal figure in leukocyte biology".

References

External links 

 Carol L. Moberg and Ralph M. Steinman, "James Gerald Hirsch", Biographical Memoirs of the National Academy of Sciences (2003)

1922 births
1987 deaths
American immunologists
Members of the United States National Academy of Sciences
Josiah Macy Jr. Foundation people
Yale University alumni
Columbia University Vagelos College of Physicians and Surgeons alumni
Members of the National Academy of Medicine